Anders Peter Sundstrup (born 17 July 1961, in Copenhagen) is a former Danish football player and now manager of the reserve team of BK Frem. He has also managed Greve Fodbold. Besides Denmark, Sundstrup has played in the Netherlands and France.

References

External links
 DBU Profile 
 
 
 Aalborg BK Profile
 Sundstrup overtager tøjlerne i Greve

1961 births
Living people
Danish men's footballers
Danish football managers
Boldklubben Frem players
Brøndby IF players
AZ Alkmaar players
SC Telstar players
FC Sochaux-Montbéliard players
AaB Fodbold players
Køge Boldklub players
Danish expatriate men's footballers
Expatriate footballers in the Netherlands
Danish expatriate sportspeople in the Netherlands
Association football forwards
Footballers from Copenhagen